The Sigma Alpha Epsilon Fraternity House is a historic fraternity house located at the University of Illinois at Urbana–Champaign in Champaign, Illinois. The house was built in 1907 for the Illinois Beta chapter of the Sigma Alpha Epsilon fraternity; founded in 1899, it was one of the oldest fraternities at the university. Architects George and Albert Dean designed the house, which combines elements of the Prairie School and American Craftsman styles; it is the university's only fraternity house to incorporate either style. The building's horizontal features, limestone caps and trim, and tall piers extending above the porch roof are characteristic Prairie School elements, while its exposed rafters and gable roof are inspired by Craftsman designs.

The building was added to the National Register of Historic Places on February 22, 1990.

References

Residential buildings on the National Register of Historic Places in Illinois
Prairie School architecture in Illinois
American Craftsman architecture in Illinois
Residential buildings completed in 1907
National Register of Historic Places in Champaign County, Illinois
Buildings and structures of the University of Illinois Urbana-Champaign
Fraternity and sorority houses
Buildings and structures in Champaign, Illinois